The 1895 Washington & Jefferson football team was an American football team that represented Washington & Jefferson College as an independent during the 1895 college football season. Led by E. Gard Edwards in his second and final year as head coach, the team compiled a record of 6–1–1.

Schedule

References

Washington and Jefferson
Washington & Jefferson Presidents football seasons
Washington and Jefferson football